HMCS St. Croix was a  that served in the Royal Canadian Navy and later the Canadian Forces from 1958 to 1974. The fourth ship commissioned in the class, she was the second ship to bear the name. Following her decommissioning, the ship was used as a training ship at Halifax, Nova Scotia until 1991, when St. Croix was sold for scrapping.

Design and description
Based on the preceding  design, the Restigouches had the same hull and propulsion, but different weaponry. Initially the St. Laurent class had been planned to be 14 ships. However the order was halved, and the following seven were redesigned to take into improvements made on the St. Laurents. As time passed, their design diverged further from that of the St. Laurents.

The Restigouches had a complement of 214.

The Restigouches were by powered by two English Electric geared steam turbines, each driving a propeller shaft, using steam provided by two Babcock & Wilcox boilers.

The Restigouches were equipped with SPS-10, SPS-12, Sperry Mk 2 and SPG-48 radar along with SQS-501 and SQS-503 sonar.

Armament
The Restigouches diverged from the St. Laurents in their weaponry. The Restigouches were equipped with two twin mounts of Vickers /70 calibre Mk 6 dual-purpose guns forward and maintained a single twin mount of 3-inch/50 calibre Mk 22 guns aft used in the preceding class. A Mk 69 fire control director was added to control the new guns. They were also armed with two Limbo Mk 10 mortars and two single Bofors 40 mm guns. However the 40 mm guns were dropped in the final design.

The destroyers were also equipped beginning in 1958 with Mk 43 homing torpedoes in an effort to increase the distance between the ships and their targets. They were pitched over the side by a modified depth charge thrower.

Service history
St. Croix, named for a river in New Brunswick, was laid down on 15 October 1954 by Marine Industries at Sorel, Quebec. The ship was launched on 17 November 1956 and commissioned into the Royal Canadian Navy on 4 October 1958 with the classification DDE 256.

Following her commissioning, the ship was assigned to the Third Canadian Escort Squadron. In 1959 as a member of the Fifth Canadian Escort Squadron, St. Croix escorted the royal yacht  with Queen Elizabeth II aboard during her visit to Canada.

In August 1964, St. Croix was transferred to the west coast. In 1966 St. Croix underwent shock testing off San Francisco.

In 1968, she was part of the Second Canadian Escort Squadron following the unification of the Canadian Armed Forces and creation of Maritime Command in 1967. In 1967 and 1969, the ship made long cruises across the Pacific, visiting Hawaii, Fiji, Australia and New Zealand. In 1973, the ship was reassigned to the east coast. She was paid off on 15 November 1974 at Halifax, Nova Scotia and placed in reserve as economies required by government reductions in authorized strength. The ship was disarmed and had her propellers removed. Her machinery spaces were converted into classrooms and the vessel was used as an engineering school ship from 1984 until 1990. The ship was sold in 1991 to Jacobson Metal of Chesapeake, Virginia and was towed from Halifax in April for scrapping.

References

Notes

Citations

Sources

External links
Canadian Navy of Yesterday & Today: Restigouche class destroyer escort

Restigouche-class destroyers
Cold War destroyers of Canada
1957 ships